Closer to the Bone is the twentieth studio album by Kris Kristofferson. The album was released on September 29, 2009 on the New West record label.

Kristofferson has said: ''Closer to the Bone is a reflective album. It's about making sense of life at this end of the game." It was originally entitled Starlight and Stone, but Kristofferson changed it to Closer to the Bone as he felt like it was more descriptive of the meaning of the album: "...the closer to the bone you are and the closer to the truth."

The song, "Good Morning John" was written in the 1970s and is about Johnny Cash. Kristofferson wrote "Sister Sinead" as a tribute to Sinéad O'Connor. The album is dedicated to Stephen Bruton.

Track listing
(All songs by Kris Kristofferson, except as noted)

"Closer to the Bone" 
"From Here to Forever" (Kristofferson, Stephen Bruton, Glen Clark)
"Holy Woman" 
"Starlight and Stone" 
"Sister Sinead" 
"Hall of Angels" 
"Love Don't Live Here Anymore" 
"Good Morning John" 
"Tell Me One More Time" 
"Let the Walls Come Down" 
"The Wonder"
"I Hate Your Ugly Face"

Personnel
Kris Kristofferson - vocals, acoustic guitar, harmonica
Rami Jaffee - keyboards
Stephen Bruton - guitar, mandolin, backing vocals
Don Was - bass guitar 
Jim Keltner - drums

Charts

Notes

External links
Kris Kristofferson|New West Records

Kris Kristofferson albums
2009 albums
Albums produced by Don Was
New West Records albums